The Eternal Flame is a 1922 American silent adventure drama film  directed by Frank Lloyd and starring Norma Talmadge, Adolphe Menjou, and Wedgwood Nowell.

Cast
Norma Talmadge as Duchesse de Langeais
Adolphe Menjou as Duc de Langeais
Wedgwood Nowell as Marquis de Ronquerolles
Conway Tearle as General de Montriveau
Rosemary Theby as Madame de Serizy
Kate Lester as Princess de Vlamont-Chaurray
Tom Ricketts as Vidame de Pameir
Otis Harlan as Abbe Conrand
Irving Cummings as Count de Marsay

Preservation status
Six of eight reels of The Eternal Flame are preserved in the Rohauer collection of the Library of Congress. Reels 3 and 8 are missing.

References

External links

1922 films
American silent feature films
American black-and-white films
Films directed by Frank Lloyd
American adventure drama films
First National Pictures films
1920s adventure drama films
1922 drama films
Films based on works by Honoré de Balzac
1920s American films
Silent American drama films
Silent adventure drama films
1920s English-language films